This is a list of the 179 members of the Parliament of Denmark, in the 1987 to 1988 session. They were elected at the 1987 general election.

Election results

Seat distribution
Below is the distribution of the 179 seats as it appeared after the 1987 election, which was also the way it appeared at the end of the term.

Parliament members elected at the September 1987 election

Party and member changes after the September 1987 elections

Lasting member changes
Below are member changes that lasted through the entire term.

Temporary member changes 
Below are temporary member replacements during the term.

References

 
1987–1988